The 2025 IHF Men's Junior World Championship will be 25th edition of the championship to be held at Poland under the aegis of International Handball Federation (IHF). It will be first time in history that the championship will be organised by Poland Handball Federation.

Bidding process
Three nations entered bid for hosting the tournament:
 
 
 

North Macedonia and Slovenia later withdrew their bid. The tournament was awarded to Poland by IHF Council in its meeting held in Cairo, Egypt on 28 February 2020.

References

External links

2025 Men's Junior World Handball Championship
Men's Junior World Handball Championship
2025
Handball in Poland
Junior World Handball Championship
Men's Junior World Handball Championship
World Men's Junior